Otar (Georgian: ოთარ) is a Georgian masculine given name. Notable people with the name include:
Otar Arveladze (born 1992), Georgian footballer
Otar Barkalaia (born 1984), Georgian rugby player
Otar Beg Orbeliani (circa. 1583–1662/63), Georgian noble
Otar Bestaev (born 1991), Kyrgyzstani judoka
Otar Chiladze (1933-2009), Georgian writer 
Otar Chkhartishvili (born 1950), Georgian naval officer
Otar Chkheidze (1920–2007), Georgian writer
Otar Dadunashvili (1928–1992), Georgian-Soviet cyclist
Otar Eloshvili (born 1978), Georgian rugby player
Otar Gabelia (born 1953), Georgian footballer
Otar Giorgadze (born 1996), Georgian rugby player
Otar Iosseliani (born 1934), Georgian-French filmmaker
Otar Japaridze (born 1987), Georgian ice dancer
Otar Kakabadze (born 1995), Georgian footballer
Otar Khetsia (born 1965), Abkhaz politician
Otar Khizaneishvili (born 1981), Georgian footballer
Otar Koberidze (1924–2015), Georgian actor, film director and screenwriter
Otar Korgalidze (born 1960), Georgian footballer and football manager
Otar Korkia (1923–2005), Georgian basketball player and coach
Otar Kushanashvili (born 1970), Georgian-Russian music journalist and broadcaster
Otari Kvantrishvili (1948–1994), Georgian organized crime boss
Otar Lordkipanidze (1930–2002), Georgian archaeologist 
Otar Martsvaladze (born 1984), Georgian footballer
Otar Patsatsia (born 1929), Georgian politician, former Prime Minister of Georgia 
Otar Taktakishvili (1924–1989), Georgian composer, teacher, conductor and musicologist
Otar Turashvili (born 1986), Georgian rugby player
Otar Tushishvili (born 1978), Georgian wrestler
 
Georgian masculine given names